Danny Akintunde Agbelese (born April 14, 1990) is an American-Nigerian professional basketball player who last played for Peristeri of the Greek Basket League. After two years at Collin College, and two years at Hampton, Agbelese entered the 2012 NBA draft, but he was not selected in the draft's two rounds. He was named MVP of the Greek Super Cup in 2020.

High school career
Agbelese played high school basketball at Massanutten Military Academy, in Woodstock, Virginia.

College career
After high school, Agbelese played college basketball at Collin College, from 2008 to 2010. After that, he transferred to Hampton, where he stayed until 2012.

Professional career
Agbelese made his first professional footprints in Iran, in the 2012–13 season, with Esteghlal Qeshm. The next year he moved to Uruguay, and joined Union Atletica. During the season, he left the club, and signed with Wanderers Paysandu. At the start of 2014, he agreed with the Spanish club Guadalajara. The same year he also played with the Greek club Rethymno and the Spanish club Ourense.

In the 2015–16 season, he played again in Spain, with Gipuzkoa Basket. In 2016, he signed with the Italian club Enel Brindisi. During the 2017–18 season, he signed with Élan Béarnais in France, but later in the season he left the club, and re-signed with Gipuzkoa Basket. He went on to average 7.5 points and 3.6 rebounds per game.

On August 6, 2018, he joined Holargos of the Greek Basket League. On August 7, 2019, Agbelese agreed to stay in Greece with Kolossos Rodou, joining his Holargos coach, Aris Lykogiannis, there.

On August 11, 2019, he signed with Kolossos Rodou of the Greek Basket League.  On July 22, 2020, Agbelese officially moved to his fourth Greek club, Promitheas Patras, which also competes in the EuroCup. 

On August 16, 2021, Agbelese signed with Real Betis of the Spanish Liga ACB. In 16 games, he averaged 2.3 points and 2.8 rebounds per contest. 

On March 6, 2022, Agbelese moved to Peristeri of the Greek Basket League for the rest of the season. In a total of 11 games, he averaged 4.5 points, 3.6 rebounds, 0.8 assists and 0.8 blocks, playing around 15 minutes per contest.

Honours
Greek Basketball Super Cup: (2020)

References

External links
RealGM.com Profile 
Basketball-Reference.com Profile
Eurobasket.com Profile
BallersAbroad.com Profile
Spanish League Profile  
Greek Basket League Profile
Italian League Profile 
Hampton College Bio

1990 births
Living people
American expatriate basketball people in Greece
American expatriate basketball people in Iran
American expatriate basketball people in Mexico
American expatriate basketball people in France
American expatriate basketball people in Spain
American expatriate basketball people in Uruguay
American men's basketball players
Basketball players from Maryland
CB Guadalajara players
Centers (basketball)
Club Ourense Baloncesto players
Élan Béarnais players
Gipuzkoa Basket players
Hampton Pirates men's basketball players
Holargos B.C. players
Kolossos Rodou B.C. players
New Basket Brindisi players
Nigerian men's basketball players
People from Lanham, Maryland
Peristeri B.C. players
Power forwards (basketball)
Real Betis Baloncesto players
Rethymno B.C. players
Promitheas Patras B.C. players
Sportspeople from the Washington metropolitan area